Davor Burcsa (born 14 August 1979) is a Croatian retired footballer who played as a goalkeeper.

Club career
Born in Osijek, Burcsa is a product of NK Osijek's youth system, where he joined the club's senior squad in 2000, but he failed to become a first-team regular so was loaned to NK Zadar. In 2002, he returned to Osijek, but he played a total of 13 games before joining Osijek's Slavonian rivals HNK Cibalia on a free transfer in 2005.

In Cibalia, Burcsa immediately became their first-choice goalkeeper. In the following four Prva HNL seasons, Burcsa was the cornerstone of Cibalia's defense which conceded around 1.5 goals per game (201 goals in 131 games). In 2009, he became the substitute of Marijan Antolović. He later played for Third division side Vukovar 1991.

References

1979 births
Living people
Footballers from Osijek
Association football goalkeepers
Croatian footballers
NK Osijek players
HNK Cibalia players
NK Zadar players
NK Pomorac 1921 players
HNK Vukovar '91 players
Croatian Football League players
Second Football League (Croatia) players